Cliff Gedge was a former Australian professional soccer player who played as a full-back for Queensland clubs and the Australia national soccer team.

Club career
Gedge spent many years playing in Ipswich. He moved to Dinmore Bush Rats in 1923. In 1924, Gedge had a one-year knee injury. He returned to club football in 1924 playing for the Dinmore Bush Rats as a goalkeeper for the rest of the 1920s.

International career
Gedge began his international career with Australia in 1923 on their second historic tour against New Zealand, debuting in a 2–1 win over New Zealand. He played all matches in the 1923 test match series against New Zealand.

Career statistics

International

References

Australian soccer players
Association football defenders
Australia international soccer players